The St. Louis Storm was a soccer team based out of St. Louis that played in the Major Indoor Soccer League. They played from 1989 to 1992. Their home arena was the St. Louis Arena.

A notable Storm player was Preki, the Yugoslav born winger who stayed with the club until its demise in 1992, when he signed for Everton in the new English FA Premier League. He later played for Portsmouth before returning to the US to play in the newly formed Major League Soccer in 1996, the same year that he was first selected for the United States national soccer team.

The Mascot for the St. Louis Storm was named “Colt Flash” (1990).

Coaches
 Don Popovic (1989–92)
  Fernando Clavijo (1992)

Yearly Awards
 All-Star Team Selection
Fernando Clavijo (1989–90) (1990–91)

 Rookie of the Year
Terry Brown (1989–90)

 Newcomer of the Year
Claudio De Oliviera (1989–90)

MVP
Fernando Clavijo (1989–90) (1990–91)

References

Defunct indoor soccer clubs in the United States
Storm
Soccer clubs in Missouri
Major Indoor Soccer League (1978–1992) teams
1989 establishments in Missouri
1992 disestablishments in Missouri